Rodolfo "Rudy" García (born April 15, 1963) is a former Republican member of the Florida Senate, representing the 40th District from 2001 through 2010. Previously he was a member of the Florida House of Representatives from 1985 through 2000. He ran for Mayor of Hialeah, Florida in 2011, but lost.

References

External links
Florida House of Representatives - Rudy García
Florida State Legislature - Senator Rudy García official government website
Project Vote Smart - Senator Rodolfo 'Rudy' García Jr. (FL) profile
Follow the Money - Rodolfo (Rudy) García, Jr.
2006 2004 2002 2000 State Senate campaign contributions
1998 State House campaign contributions

|-

|-

|-

|-

Republican Party Florida state senators
Republican Party members of the Florida House of Representatives
1963 births
Living people
American politicians of Cuban descent
Hispanic and Latino American state legislators in Florida